The Ohio State Reformatory (OSR), also known as the Mansfield Reformatory, is a historic prison located in Mansfield, Ohio in the United States. It was built between 1886 and 1910 and remained in operation until 1990, when a United States Federal Court ruling (the 'Boyd Consent Decree') ordered the facility to be closed. While this facility was seen in a number of films (including several while the facility was still in operation), TV shows and music videos, it was made famous by the film The Shawshank Redemption (1994) when it was used for most scenes of the movie.

The Ohio State Reformatory is currently open to tourists 4 days a week from 11 a.m. to 4 p.m. from April 1 to September 2. There are also tours on weekends from February 2 to March 31 and holiday tours on weekends from November 23 to December 23.

History

The history of the Ohio State Reformatory began in 1862: the field where the reformatory would be built was used as a training camp for Civil War soldiers. The camp was named Camp Mordecai Bartley in honor of the Mansfield man who served as Ohio Governor in the 1840s.

In 1867, Mansfield was promoted as a candidate for the placement of the new Intermediate Penitentiary (the original name before it was changed to Ohio State Reformatory). The city raised $10,000 to purchase 30 acres of land for the prison, and the state acquired 150 acres of adjoining land for $20,000; the cost of the facility was $1,326,769. The Intermediate (Ohio State Reformatory) was intended as just that, a halfway point between the Boys Industrial School in Lancaster and the State Penitentiary in Columbus which was intended to house young first-time offenders. Construction began in 1886 and remained under construction until 1910 due to funding problems which caused construction delays.

The original architect for the design was Levi T. Scofield from Cleveland, who used three architectural styles; Victorian Gothic, Richardsonian Romanesque and Queen Anne. Scofield designed the reformatory with these unique styles to help encourage inmates to become reborn back into their spiritual lives. The creation and construction of the entire building was entrusted to well-known architect F.F. Schnitzer, whose name also appears on the cornerstone, and is recorded as Superintendent and Supervising Architect on documents found there. In 1891 the name was changed from Intermediate Penitentiary to Ohio State Reformatory.

On September 15, 1896, the reformatory opened its doors to its first 150 offenders. These prisoners were brought by train from Columbus and put immediately to work on the prison sewer system and the 25-foot stone wall surrounding the complex. Schnitzer was presented with a silver double inkwell by the governor of the state in a lavish ceremony to thank him for his services. The exterior of the building, which is built from brick and concrete, is designed in the Romanesque style giving the frontage a castle-like appearance. 

From 1935 until 1959 Arthur Lewis Glattke was the Superintendent. Initially a political appointment following Glattke's work on the Martin Davey campaign, by all accounts Glattke was respected by professionals and inmates alike. He implemented many reforms such as piped-in radio music in the cell blocks. Glattke's wife, Helen Bauer Glattke, died of pneumonia three days following an accident in November 1950 where a handgun discharged when she was reaching into a jewelry box in the family's quarters. Glattke died following a heart attack suffered in his office on February 10, 1959.

Over 200 people died at the OSR, including two guards who were killed during escape attempts.

Closure
The Reformatory remained in full operation until December 1990 when it was closed via federal court order.  As the result of a prisoners' class action suit citing overcrowding and inhumane conditions (Boyd v. Denton, C.A. 78-1054A (N.D.Oh.)), District Judge Frank J. Battisti of the United States District Court for the Northern District of Ohio ordered the prison closed by the end of December 1986.  This order was known as the Boyd Consent Decree. The closing date was moved to 1990 due to delays in constructing the replacement facility, the Mansfield Correctional Institution, which stands to the west of the old prison.

Most of the grounds and support buildings, including the outer wall, have been demolished since the closing. In 1995, the Mansfield Reformatory Preservation Society was formed. They have turned the prison into a museum and conduct tours to help fund grounds rehabilitation projects and currently work to stabilize the buildings against further deterioration.

The East Cell Block remains the largest free-standing steel cell block in the world at six tiers high.

Restoration and tours

The Mansfield Reformatory Preservation Society is currently working to restore the facility to its original state. Restorations to date include the removal of debris, replacement of roofing, complete restoration of the Warden's quarters, as well as the complete restoration of the central guard room between the East and West Cell Blocks.

The restorations are being funded through donations and tour fees.  The windows of the south side east cell block have been replaced, and all of the original stained glass windows that were in the building are planned to be replaced. Throughout the Halloween season, the building hosts a haunted house through Blood Prison.

The Ohio State Reformatory offers three types of guided tours: History Meets Hollywood which summarizes the history and movie history, Beyond the Bars which focuses more on the history and access to areas off the tour-route, and the Inmate tour which is guided by a former inmate at The Ohio State Reformatory.

The Ohio State Reformatory offers ghost tours as well as the normal daytime tours. They offer public ghost hunts for casual ghost hunters, private ghost hunts for more experienced ghost hunters, ghost walks for children 13 years and up, ghost hunt classes for children 13 years and up, and special ghost hunt events hosted by famous ghost hunters, celebrities, or historians.

Events 
The Ohio State Reformatory currently hosts several different events throughout the year, one of the most popular being the INKcarceration Music & Tattoo Festival, which is a 3-day rock band show in mid-July. A few of the other events include The Shawshank Hustle a 7k running race that goes past 5 film locations of The Shawshank Redemption, Murder Mystery Dinner Theatre  which is written and acted out by the Mansfield Playhouse, Mansfield Mayhem a photography event hosted by the Professional Photographers of Ohio, and the Pour One Nine Beerfest which features over 25 brews and wines as well as live artists and food.

Films and television

The Ohio State Reformatory facility has been used as a location for many film and television productions, and is best known for its appearance as Shawshank State Prison in the 1994 film The Shawshank Redemption.

 Harry and Walter Go to New York (1975) – Harry and Walter spend some time behind bars at the penitentiary, when the prison was still in operation.
 Tango & Cash (1989) – The facility was used for various prison scenes, when the prison was still in operation.
 The Shawshank Redemption (1994) – The prison was used for a large panning scene and the warden's office; an officers' quarters were used to shoot a sequence set in a civilian apartment.
 Air Force One (1997) – The prison was used for scenes of a Russian prison for General Ivan Radek.
 Godsmack "Awake" music video, 2000.
 Marilyn Manson promotional photography, 1996 – Frontman, Brian Hugh Warner, grew up in Canton, Ohio.
 Ohio State Reformatory has been the subject of numerous paranormal investigation shows, including the Fox Family Channel's Scariest Stories on Earth, and Scariest Places On Earth.
 The Travel Channel did a tourism documentary  on the OSR.
 The Travel Channel's television show Destination Fear filmed at the location for the fourth episode of their third season.
 In 2005, The Atlantic Paranormal Society (TAPS) investigated the facility for the SciFi Channel's TV series Ghost Hunters.
 In 2004 Lil Wayne featured this prison in his video for the song "Go DJ".
 In April 2006 the horror/thriller motion picture Fallen Angels (2007) was filmed almost entirely at OSR. 
 WWE shot a promotional poster featuring Triple H for their 2008 Judgment Day event in the facility.

 In 2009 the facility was featured on Ghost Adventures in Season 3 Episode 4.
 In 2010, the facility was used for an episode of Ghost Hunters Academy.
 It is the filming place for the music video of the song "Relentless Chaos" by Miss May I.
 The Purple Smoke Project (Hip hop group) filmed a video for the song "Calm Down" in 2011.
 Attack Attack! shot a portion of their video "Smokahontas" in 2011.
 Anti-Flag shot the majority of their video for "The New Sound" in the prison.
 The National Geographic Channel featured the prison on the show Inside: Secret America S1/Ep 05 for the episode "Ghosts" in 2013.
 Ghost Asylum on Destination America in 2015.
 In 2016 the reformatory was investigated and featured on The Hambone Show.
 David Allen Coe and The Moonshine Bandits (2017)  recorded a music video for "Take This Job and Shove It".
 In 2017, nu-metal act Motograter filmed a video for the song "Dorian".
 On May 11, 2018, the facility was featured on an episode of BuzzFeed Unsolved.
 On December 4, 2018, the facility was featured on Discovery Channel show Mysteries of the Abandoned, Season 3, Episode 10.
 In fall 2018, Escape Plan: The Extractors with Sylvester Stallone was filmed at the facility.
 In April 2019, the facility was used to film country music artist Eric Church's "Some of It" music video.
 In May 2019, American YouTuber MrBeast did a 24-hour challenge video in the prison with the title, “24 Hours in The Most Haunted Place on Earth”.
On November 25 and 26, 2019, filming for Judas and the Black Messiah took place at the Reformatory.
 In February 2020, Chris Jericho had an episode of his podcast, Talk is Jericho, about the prison and the fact that it is supposedly haunted.
 In November or December 2021 YouTubers Sam Golbach & Colby Brock did a paranormal investigation for their YouTube series The Attachment.
 Between May and June of 2022, Shelby Oaks filmed scenes at this location.

References

External links

 Mansfield Reformatory Preservation Society
 Ohio State Reformatory at Abandoned
 Pittsburgh Post-Gazette article on the prison
 Ohio State Reformatory Haunted Report by Paranormal Research Society
 A Haunted Visitor's Guide

Defunct prisons in Ohio
Buildings and structures in Mansfield, Ohio
Prison museums in the United States
Museums in Richland County, Ohio
National Register of Historic Places in Richland County, Ohio
Government buildings on the National Register of Historic Places in Ohio
Prisons on the National Register of Historic Places
History museums in Ohio
Reportedly haunted locations in Ohio
1886 establishments in Ohio